Josep Eduard Almudéver Mateu (30 July 1919 – 24 May 2021) was a Franco-Spanish volunteer who served during the Spanish Civil War in the International Brigades. He was believed to be the last surviving member of same at the time of his death.

Biography 
Josep Eduard Almudéver Mateu was born in Marseille into a Spanish family and grew up in Casablanca in French Morocco and Alcàsser in Spain. He held both French and Spanish nationality. At the time of the July 1936 coup, he was living with his family in Valencia. Although still a minor, he became a volunteer on the Republican side. 

Hiding his age, he joined the Pablo Iglesias Column, which was deployed to the Teruel. Wounded at the Teruel Front, Almudéver was sent to the rear; he re-joined the army as a part of the CXXIX International Brigade. Between early 1939 and late 1942, he was a prisoner of the Francoist regime and later served with the Spanish Maquis in north-east Spain. Forced into exile in France in 1947, he lived in Pamiers near Toulouse and did not return to Spain until 1965. He remained a committed communist until his death.

He died in France on 24 May 2021, at the age of 101. At the time of his death, he was the last known survivor of the International Brigades.

Filmography 
 Joseph Almudever, interview de Jean-Michel Caralp, Université Paul Valéry Montpellier 3, France, 2019.
 Joseph Almudever, '', interview de Jean-Michel Caralp, Université Paul Valéry Montpellier 3, France, 2019.

References 

1919 births
2021 deaths
Military personnel from Marseille
French centenarians
International Brigades personnel
Men centenarians
 prisoners and detainees of Spain
French people of Spanish descent
French communists
French expatriates in Spain
French expatriates in Morocco
French Anti-Francoists